Camp Hell is a 2010 American horror film starring Will Denton, Dana Delany, Andrew McCarthy, Bruce Davison and Jesse Eisenberg. The film was previously titled Camp Hope. It was released August 13, 2010 in the United States.

Plot
By the end of each summer, children from the fundamentalist Catholic community in the suburbs of New Jersey visited Camp Hope. Deep in the woods, away from civilization, the children are taught the ways of cult-like Christianity, the temptations of the flesh, and the horror of Satan. The head priest, who teaches the children these doctrines of fundamentalist Catholicism, has unknowingly brought evil with him by solely focusing on sin instead of salvation. The priest fills these young minds with the belief that everything they do is an occasion of sin. He delves deep into their psyche asking them things like whether or not they masturbate, because masturbation, according to the Catholic Church, is the same as premarital sex and gives the devil a foothold in their hearts and minds. The priest also goes so far as to call a girl at the camp a whore simply because she was talking to a male member of the camp. These psychological attacks take their toll, and the presence of a demon starts to creep into the minds of the children, especially the main character, Tommy Leary.

Tommy's grandfather had recently died and the afterlife is very much on his mind. At the same time, his innocent relationship with his childhood crush slowly becomes more physical until the two escape into the woods for a sexual encounter. Melissa, his crush, is caught and sent home, allowing the priest to focus on Tommy. The priest takes Tommy down a psychological and spiritual path that makes the presence of the demon real to him, and it begins to haunt him.

The movie ends with Tommy, after a confrontation with the priest and a near suicide attempt, denouncing his faith in the God he was being taught about and goes on a different path. The priest, after his emotionally brutal encounter with Tommy in his cabin, suffers a stroke. The members of the community struggle over whether to pull the plug, hoping for a miracle, while the priest spends the rest of his life in a persistent vegetative state, eyes wide open, with a look of horror on his face.

On the way home from the hospital, Tommy finds a note given to him earlier by Melissa telling him when he can to find her and be with her.  As the car drives on, he opens the window and throws out the copy of Dante's Inferno, which falls open on the road to a picture of a demon.

Cast
 Bruce Davison as Fr. Phineas McAllister
 Will Denton as Tommy Leary
 Christopher Denham as Christian
 Connor Paolo as Jack
 Valentina de Angelis as Melissa
 Spencer Treat Clark as Timothy
 Dana Delany as Patricia Leary
 Andrew McCarthy as Michael Leary
 Jesse Eisenberg as Daniel Jacobs
 Drew Powell as Bob
 James McCaffrey as Dr. John
 Sasha Neulinger as Jimmy
 Caroline London as Rose Leary
 Ryan Knowles as Demon
 Ato Essandoh as Young Priest
 Chris Northrop as Death Metal Kid
 Joseph Vincent Cordaro as Ryan

Release 
The film was released in the United States on August 13, 2010. Lionsgate released the film on DVD in the United States in 2011.

Lawsuit
Jesse Eisenberg filed a lawsuit against Lionsgate Entertainment and Grindstone Entertainment for trying to fraudulently capitalize on his fame by using his name and face to promote a movie in which he was largely absent. Legal documents state:"Eisenberg is bringing this lawsuit in order to warn his fans and public that, contrary to the manner in which the defendants are advertising the film, Eisenberg is not the star of and does not appear in a prominent role in Camp Hell, but instead has a cameo role in Camp Hell."

Eisenberg asked for damages of at least US$3 million. In June 2012 he won a preliminary in the case with the judge stating: "The content of the materials was commercial, by virtue of proposing a commercial transaction, despite perhaps falsely leading the consumer to believe that [Eisenberg] is the star of the film. (...) The court thus finds that the speech at issue in this case constitutes commercial speech, which is not subject to protection under [the anti-SLAPP law]."

Reception 
Nigel Floyd, writing for Time Out said that "budgetary limitations, a plodding script, ropey visual effects and an excruciating score undercut a heartfelt cautionary tale about a confused teenager wrestling with his religious faith and the dogmatism of his overzealous elders."

Rich Cline, in a review for Shadows on the Wall said that "the grounded approach and honest performances are provocative and unsettling. As is the fact that it's based on a true story."

References

External links
 

American horror films
2010 films
2010s English-language films
2010s American films
Advertising and marketing controversies in film
Casting controversies in film
Works subject to a lawsuit